Dichelostemma multiflorum is a species of flowering plant known by the common names round-tooth snake-lily, many-flower brodiaea and wild hyacinth (although the latter name is shared with a number of other taxa). It is native to California and Oregon, where it grows in hills, mountains, and inland grasslands. It is a perennial wildflower erecting a tall, naked stem topped with a spherical inflorescence of up to 35 densely packed purple or pink-purple flowers. Each flower is a tube about a centimeter long with six petal-like lobes arranged in a starlike corolla. The lobes may curl back slightly.

External links
Jepson Manual Treatment
USDA Plants Profile
Photo gallery

multiflorum
Flora of California
Flora of Oregon
Flora of the Klamath Mountains
Flora of the Sierra Nevada (United States)
Natural history of the California chaparral and woodlands
Natural history of the California Coast Ranges
Flora without expected TNC conservation status